The Federal Board of Revenue (FBR), formerly known as Central Board of Revenue (CBR), is a federal law enforcement agency of Pakistan that investigates tax crimes, suspicious accumulation of wealth, money-laundering make regulation of collection of tax. FBR operates through Inspectors-IR that keep tax evaders under surveillance, assess taxable incomes and perform special tasks for FBR Headquarters. FBR performs role of collection of taxation in the country from all individuals and businesses.

FBR also collects intelligence on tax evasion and administers tax laws for the Government of Pakistan and acts as the central revenue collection agency of Pakistan.

History
Established as the Central Board of Revenue on 1 April 1924 through enactment of the "Central Board of Revenue Act, 1924". In 1944, the CBR was put under the Revenue Division with the Ministry of Finance until 1960, when on the recommendations of the "Administrative Reorganization Committee", the CBR was made into a division of the Ministry of Finance. In 1974, further changes were made to streamline the organization and its functions. In 1991, the CBR was once again reverted to its original status under the Revenue Division, however in January 1995, the Revenue Division was abolished and the CBR was once again reverted to a division of the Ministry of Finance. In 2007, the "FBR Act" was passed in July 2007, whereby the Central Board of Revenue was renamed to the present-day Federal Board of Revenue and for a third time placed again under the Revenue Division of the Ministry of Finance.

FBR primarily operates through its main collection arms comprising Regional Tax Offices (RTOs) and Large Taxpayer Units (LTUs) across the country.

Structure

Wings

Pakistan Customs
Inland Revenue Service
Administration
Taxpayers Audit
Legal
FATE
SPR & S
HRM
Information Technology
Accounting
RA&R

Directorates

Directorate General of Transit Trade - Pakistan Customs
Directorate of Broadening of Tax Base (Special Directorate)
Directorate General of Intelligence & Investigation - Pakistan Customs 
Directorate General of Internal Audit - Pakistan Customs 
Directorate General of Input Output Coefficient Organization - Pakistan Customs 
Directorate General of Reform & Automation - Pakistan Customs
Directorate of Post Clearance Audit - Pakistan Customs 
Directorate General of Valuation - Pakistan Customs 
Directorate General of Training & Research - Pakistan Customs 
Directorate General of Intelligence & Investigation - Inland Revenue
Directorate general of Training and Research - Inland Revenue 
Directorate of Withholding Tax - Inland Revenue 
Directorate General of Internal Audit - Inland Revenue

Members of the Board

 Mr. Asim Ahmad - Chairman/Secretary Revenue Division
 
 Mr. Faiz Illahi Memon - Member Admin/HR
 
 Mr. Malik Amjad Zubair Tiwana - Member Inland Revenue Operations
 
 Mr. Mukarram Jah Ansari - Member Customs-Operations
 
 Ms. Suraiyya Ahmed Butt - Member Customs Policy
 
 Mr. Afaque Ahmed Qureshi - Member Inland Revenue Policy

 Ms. Zeba Hai Azhar - Member Legal & Accounting - Customs

 Mr. Sardar Ali Khawaja - Member - Public Relations

 Mr. Ardsher Saleem Tariq - Member Reforms & Modernization 
 
 Syed Ghulam Abbas Kazmi - Member Legal-IR 

 Mr. Ahmad Shuja Khan - Member Accounting & Audit

 Mr. Abdul Majid Yousfani - Member IT
 

Mr. Nadir Mumtaz Warraich (IRS)
Mr. Abdul Rashid Sheikh (PCS)
Mr. Muhammad Asghar Khan (PCS)
Dr. Muhammad Ashfaq Ahmed (IRS)
Mr. Ch Muhammad Tarique (IRS)
Mr. Ahmed Raza Khan (PCS)
Mr. Asim Majid Khan (IRS)
Mr. Syed Syedain Raza Zaidi (IRS)

Chairman/Chairperson CBR/FBR
The FBR Chairman is the executive forerunner of the board and is liable to formulate and enforce the fiscal policies of the country, decide on taxes and duties and ultimately act as a referent to the judicial appeals to the board. The chairman serves an essential job to operate in sync with the economic and trade ministers of the country as well as keep up with the prime minister of the state.

Incumbent

List of Regional Tax Offices across Pakistan 

Regional Tax Office in Sahiwal is the most recent addition to the tax machinery. It became operative on October 1, 2017.

References

Pakistan federal departments and agencies
Taxation in Pakistan
Ministry of Finance (Pakistan)
Pakistan